Henrik Andersson (born 2 May 1977) is a former professional tennis player from Sweden.

Career
Andersson made his ATP singles main draw debut at the 1997 Swedish Open as a qualifier, losing to world number 71 Jeff Tarango.

The Swede won one Challenger title, but most of his singles matches were played on the Futures circuit. He reached four finals on the Futures circuit, winning one title and also won nine doubles titles on the Futures circuit.

Andersson has a career high ATP singles ranking of 314 achieved on 23 October 2000. He also has a career high ATP doubles ranking of 352 achieved on 28 February 2000.

Challenger titles

Singles: (1)

ITF Futures titles

Singles: (1)

Doubles: (9)

References

External links
 
 

1977 births
Living people
Swedish male tennis players
Tennis players from Stockholm
20th-century Swedish people